Bernhard Borchert (1 December 1863, Riga – 1945) was a Baltic-German painter who spent the greatest part of his life in Latvia. He entered the Imperial Academy of Arts in Saint Petersburg in 1883, and was in 1885 awarded a silver medal from the same institute. He produced book and magazine illustrations.

He was the author of the "Baltic artists’ painting exhibition" (Baltijas mākslinieku gleznu izstāde).

See also
 List of Baltic German artists

Artwork

References

Latvian artists
Baltic-German people
1863 births
1945 deaths